The discography of English recording artist Jake Bugg consists of five studio albums, seven EPs and thirty-two singles (including one as a featured artist).

Studio albums

Extended plays

Singles

As lead artist

As featured artist

Other charted songs

Guest appearances

Notes

References 

Discographies of British artists